Ruthven is a village in Angus, Scotland.

See also 
 Ruthven Castle, Angus

References

Villages in Angus, Scotland